OM3 may refer to:
Olympus OM-3 camera
Multi-mode optical fiber type OM3